The 1991 season was the Washington Redskins' 60th in the National Football League (NFL), their 55th representing Washington, D.C. and the eleventh under head coach Joe Gibbs.

The Redskins were coming off two consecutive 10–6 seasons and looking to return to the playoffs for a second straight season. Not only did the Redskins improve their position, but they also put together a season that is considered by some to be one of the best any team has ever played. Washington won a franchise record-tying 14 games, the best record in the league, and their two losses (to two of their division rivals) were by a combined five points. The Redskins ended their campaign as world champions, knocking off the defending AFC Champion Buffalo Bills in Super Bowl XXVI.

The Redskins led the league in scoring with 485 points and allowed the second-fewest points (224) in the league in 1991. (As of the 1991 season, this was the third-highest total in NFL history, and still ranks in the top 20 all-time.) They had a +18 turnover ratio, also best in the NFL. In 2016, Chris Chase of USA Today ranked the team as the greatest to ever win a Super Bowl. As of 2022, this is Washington's most recent appearance in the NFC Championship Game and the Super Bowl. In addition, this is also Washington's most recent season winning more than 10 regular season games.

Statistics site Football Outsiders ranks the 1991 Redskins as the best team they have measured (from 1986 to present). The team ranked #15 on the 100 greatest teams of all time presented by the NFL on its 100th anniversary.

The season
Quarterback Mark Rypien had an outstanding year. His 8.5 yards per pass attempt was second in the league, and his 3,564 passing yards were best in the NFC and fourth in the league. Running back Earnest Byner's 1,048 rushing yards were 5th best in the NFL. The Redskins had two wide receivers who went over 1,000 yards receiving in 1991: Gary Clark (1,340) and Art Monk (1,049).

The Redskins beat the Buffalo Bills 37–24 to win Super Bowl XXVI. The team is the last Super Bowl champion to never trail in any of their playoff victories. The Redskins' Super Bowl XXVI win was their first in a non-strike season. With the championship, coach Joe Gibbs also became the first head coach to win three Super Bowls with three different quarterbacks.

In 2007, ESPN.com ranked the 1991 Redskins as the 4th greatest team in NFL history, noting, "you can look at two stats to get a pretty good idea of just how great a team is: yards gained per pass attempt, and yards allowed per pass attempt. The 1991 'Skins topped the NFL in each category, with Mark Rypien averaging 8.5 yards per attempt, while his colleagues on Washington's defense allowed only 6 yards per attempt.... The 'Skins outscored their opponents 485–224, and they had a tough schedule. After going 14–2, they romped through the NFC playoffs, beating the Falcons 24–7 and demolishing the Lions 41–10 on their way to the Super Bowl. In the Big Game, the 'Skins beat the cursed early-1990s Bills 37–24."

Statistics site Football Outsiders has ranked the 1991 Redskins as the greatest team in their ratings history, stating that the team "may have been the most well-rounded team in NFL history. [...] A lot of the best teams in NFL history got a little extra boost by picking on an easy schedule, but not Washington. They had an average schedule, and a harder-than-average schedule of opposing defenses. One reason for that: 1991 was not only the year of the best overall team in [their rating system's] history. It was also the year of the best defense in [their system's] history, which showed up on Washington's schedule twice: the 1991 Philadelphia Eagles."

Personnel

Staff

Roster

Preseason

Regular season

Schedule

Game summaries

Week 1

Week 2

Week 3

Week 4

Washington would not beat the Bengals again until 2020.

Week 5

Week 6

Week 7

Week 9

Week 10

Week 11

Week 12

Week 13

Week 14

Week 15

Week 16

Week 17

Standings

Playoffs

Schedule

Game summaries

NFC Divisional Playoffs: vs Atlanta Falcons

NFC Championship Game: vs Detroit Lions

Super Bowl XXVI: vs Buffalo Bills

Statistics

Passing

Rushing

Receiving

Kicking

Awards and records
 Mark Rypien, Super Bowl Most Valuable Player
 Mark Rypien, UPI NFC Player of the Year
 Mark Rypien, Pro Bowl Selection

Milestones
 November 10, 1991 – Mark Rypien threw for 442 yards and 6 touchdowns against the Atlanta Falcons, despite being taken out of the game in the middle of the 4th quarter; when Atlanta did the same, their third-string quarterback, a rookie named Brett Favre, made his NFL debut – and his first pass was intercepted and returned for a touchdown. On that same day, Warren Moon of the Houston Oilers threw for over 400 yards as well in an overtime win over the Dallas Cowboys.

Best team ever
In 2010, ESPN conducted a "super league," consisting of the best Super Bowl winning teams of all time; the 1991 Redskins finished the regular season in first place with a record of 14-2 and beat the 1992 Dallas Cowboys in the "Super Bowl" to be named the greatest team of all time. Football Outsiders also has them ranked as the best team in NFL history based on their advanced analysis.

References

External links
 1991 Washington Redskins at Pro-Football-Reference.com

Washington
Washington Redskins seasons
NFC East championship seasons
National Football Conference championship seasons
Super Bowl champion seasons
Red